Robert Fleming (born 11 March 1860) was a Scottish footballer who played as a right winger.

Career
Born in Greenock, Fleming played for hometown club Morton, becoming their first ever international player when he represented Scotland in 1886.

References

1860 births
Year of death missing
Scottish footballers
Scotland international footballers
Greenock Morton F.C. players
Association football wingers
Place of death missing
Footballers from Greenock